Damir Anić (24 July 1944 – 12 December 1992) was a Croatian gymnast. He competed in eight events at the 1968 Summer Olympics.

References

1944 births
1992 deaths
Croatian male artistic gymnasts
Olympic gymnasts of Yugoslavia
Gymnasts at the 1968 Summer Olympics
Sportspeople from Zagreb